Route 375 or Highway 375 may refer to:

Canada
Manitoba Provincial Road 375
New Brunswick Route 375
Saskatchewan Highway 375

Japan
 Japan National Route 375

United States
  Interstate 375
  Arkansas Highway 375
  Florida State Road 375
  Georgia State Route 375 (former)
  Maryland Route 375 (unsigned)
  Nevada State Route 375
  New York State Route 375
  Puerto Rico Highway 375
  Texas State Highway Loop 375
  Virginia State Route 375
  Wyoming Highway 375